Eric James Raich (born November 1, 1951) is an American former professional baseball baseball player. A ,  right-handed pitcher, he appeared in Major League Baseball for the Cleveland Indians in –, pitching in 19 career games. He currently works as a pitching instructor at The Brunswick B.A.T. Cage baseball training facility in a suburb of Cleveland, Ohio.

Raich attended Dominguez High School of Compton, California, and the University of Southern California. He was selected by the Indians with the first overall pick in the January 1972 Major League Baseball Draft. In 1975, Raich started 17 games for the Indians (making one relief appearance) and registered his two career complete games, winning seven of 15 decisions and compiling an earned run average of 5.54 in 92 innings pitched. He worked in only one game and 2 innings for Cleveland at the tail end of the following season. He spent the rest of his career in minor league baseball, leaving the game after the 1978 season.

Altogether, he allowed 125 hits and 31 bases on balls in 95 Major League innings, striking out 35.

External links

1951 births
Living people
Baseball players from California
Baseball players from Detroit
Charlotte O's players
Cleveland Indians players
Elmira Pioneers players
Jersey City Indians players
Major League Baseball pitchers
Oklahoma City 89ers players
San Antonio Brewers players
Toledo Mud Hens players
USC Trojans baseball players